Macrorhynchia is a genus of hydroids in the family Aglaopheniidae.

Species
The following species are classified in this genus:
Macrorhynchia allmani (Nutting, 1900)
Macrorhynchia ambigua Watson, 2000
Macrorhynchia asymmetrica Di Camillo, Puce & Bavestrello, 2009
Macrorhynchia balei (Nutting, 1905)
Macrorhynchia clarkei (Nutting, 1900)
Macrorhynchia crestata Schuchert, 2015
Macrorhynchia curta (Nutting, 1900)
Macrorhynchia disjuncta (Pictet, 1893)
Macrorhynchia filamentosa (Lamarck, 1816)
Macrorhynchia fulva Di Camillo, Puce & Bavestrello, 2009
Macrorhynchia furcata (Nutting, 1900)
Macrorhynchia grandis (Clarke, 1879)
Macrorhynchia gravelyi Mammen, 1967
Macrorhynchia hawaiensis (Nutting, 1906)
Macrorhynchia meteor El Beshbeeshy, 1995
Macrorhynchia mulderi (Bartlett, 1907)
Macrorhynchia nuttingi (Hargitt, 1927)
Macrorhynchia philippina Kirchenpauer, 1872
Macrorhynchia phoenicea (Busk, 1852)
Macrorhynchia protecta (Antsulevich, 1992)
Macrorhynchia quadriarmata Watson, 2000
Macrorhynchia racemifera (Allman, 1883)
Macrorhynchia ramosa (Fewkes, 1881)
Macrorhynchia similis (Nutting, 1906)
Macrorhynchia singularis (Billard, 1908)
Macrorhynchia spiralis   (Galea, 2020)

References

Aglaopheniidae
Hydrozoan genera